The 2015–16 North Superleague is the fifteenth staging of the North Superleague, the highest tier of league competition in the North Region of the Scottish Junior Football Association. The season began on 11 August 2015. The winners of this competition are eligible to enter the 2016–17 Scottish Cup

Banks O' Dee won the championship on 14 May 2016, to claim their third North Superleague title.

Member clubs for the 2015–16 season

Hermes are the reigning champions.

North First Division (East) champions Bridge of Don Thistle replaced the relegated New Elgin. North First Division (West) champions Grantown were refused promotion due to ground criteria. Runners-up Dufftown were eventually promoted after defeating Cruden Bay, 7–1 in a play-off match.

League table

Results

References

External links
 North Region JFA

North Superleague
SJFA North Region Superleague seasons